Asbury Dickins (1780–1861) was a United States government official who served as Secretary of the United States Senate from 1836 until shortly before his death in 1861.

Originally from North Carolina, Dickins worked as a publisher and a bookseller before entering government service as chief clerk of the U.S. Department of the Treasury in 1829. He then moved to the U.S. Department of State in 1833, again serving as the department's chief clerk. Dickins finally became Secretary of the Senate in 1836 and served under both Democratic and Whig majorities. During his tenure, the Secretary's office increased in size and professionalism.

References

U.S. Senate Art & History site: Asbury Dickins
Francis Asbury Dickins papers
State Department

Further reading
 

1780 births
1861 deaths
Secretaries of the United States Senate
United States Department of State officials
American publishers (people)
People from North Carolina
Chief Clerks of the United States Department of State
19th-century American businesspeople